John Fortune Lawrence (9 September 1904 – 13 August 1984) was an Irish cricketer.

Biography
Jack Lawrence was born John Fortune Lawrence in Dublin, Ireland on 9 September 1904. A right-handed batsman, he played one first-class cricket match for Dublin University against Northamptonshire in June 1926. Lawrence died on 13 August 1984, in Eastbourne, Sussex, England.

References

1904 births
1984 deaths
Irish cricketers
Dublin University cricketers
Cricketers from County Dublin